The United States U-18 men's national soccer team is controlled by the United States Soccer Federation. The U.S. under-18 men's national team serves as a transition for players between the under-17 and the under-20 national teams. Though the team does not compete in a world championship, it competes in international tournaments and holds several domestic training camps throughout the year.

Head coach history
  Mitch Murray (1996–1999)
  George Gelnovatch (1999–2003)
  Bob Jenkins (2004–2008)
  Mike Matkovich (2009–2011)
  Richie Williams (2011–2012)
  Javier Pérez (2012–2015)
  Omid Namazi (2016–2018)

Competitive record

Pan American Games

See also

 United States men's national soccer team
 United States men's national under-23 soccer team
 United States men's national under-20 soccer team
 United States men's national under-19 soccer team
 United States men's national under-17 soccer team

References

External links
 U-18 Men's National Team

North American national under-18 association football teams
Youth soccer in the United States
Soc
U18
U18